Ek Hasina Thi (English: There Was A Beautiful Woman) is a 2004 Indian Hindi-language neo-noir thriller film directed by Sriram Raghavan, produced by Ram Gopal Varma, and starring Urmila Matondkar and Saif Ali Khan in the lead roles. The screenplay was by Sriram Raghavan and Pooja Ladha Surti. The film borrows elements from the Sidney Sheldon story If Tomorrow Comes. In her review, critic Ronjita Kulkarni says that it's "loosely based" on Double Jeopardy, while "the film also adapts a scene from The Bone Collector." The film was premiered at the New York Asian Film Festival. The film is usually considered one of the best works of Urmila Matondkar, Saif Ali Khan and director Sriram Raghavan.

Plot 
Sarika (Urmila Matondkar) is a single woman staying alone in Mumbai working at a travel agency. She meet Karan (Saif Ali Khan) by chance who apparently is smitten by her. Though she resists his advances at first she eventually gives in to his charms and lives-in with him.Life is good and one day Karan requests Sarika to host one of his friends for a few hours that he will be gone. Sarika agrees and Karan's friend turns in with a suitcase at Sarika's place and goes out. Its not until the evening news she sees the same guy was gunned down by police for being a wanted criminal.Sarika is shocked and calls Karan who tells her to get rid of his friend's suitcase that he had left at Sarika's place. Sarika takes the suitcase and is stepping out when suddenly she is intercepted by cops who arrest her as Karan's criminal friend was at her place. Karan requests her to speak to his lawyer Kamlesh Mathur and not to take his name anywhere in this investigation.The attorney advises her to confess the crime, convincing her that since she has a clean record and no prior convictions judge will accept her mistake as first time and let her go . 

After being convinced that the judge will give her a light sentence and might even set her free for co-operation, Sarika complies. But, the judge sentences her to seven years hard labour without parole. Sarika then realises that Karan and his attorney have tricked her.Karan is an associate to the underworld and that he had her framed to keep police eyes away from him. This realisation is soon followed by the death of her father, the ongoing ordeal of prison life and hatred towards Karan.  An elder inmate Pramila (Pratima Kazmi), who has contacts outside the prison, decides to help her. Sarika undergoes a complete change of appearance.

Sarika changes from inside and outside which begins with her getting rid of her fear of rats. She beats up an abusive inmate Gomati who constantly bullies her.She plans an audacious escape from prison in which she succeeds along with a few inmates. Karan is notified about her escape by Kamlesh Mathur , Karan gives no further thought to it. 
ACP Malti Vaidya (Seema Biswas) sets out to find Sarika after she escapes from prison. Sarika first confronts attorney Mathur, killing him after learning Karan's whereabouts. Sarika learns that Karan is working for a gangster (Abhay Bhargava) who has many illegal operations under his garb & is in Delhi.

Sarika finds Karan In Delhi with his new girlfriend.She takes a room right opposite to Karan's so that she can keep n eye out when he leaves and comes from his suite .She trails him day and night without Karan being suspicious. ACP Malti Vaidya Tracks Sarika when she mistakenly makes a phone call to her mother from a prepaid sim in Delhi. Karan meantime is in trouble with a local gangster Sanjeev for not laundering money on time. He is picked up from a nightclub by Sanjeev's henchmen and hauled to his place where he is threatened to clear his dues ASAP or face dire consequences. The whole exchange is witnessed by Sarika secretly. As soon as Karan leaves the room Sanjeev is found killed and the whole suspicion falls on Karan. 

Karan is naturally suspected of murdering Sanjeev. Karan and his girlfriend are attacked in the hotel that leaves his new girlfriend and few henchmen dead. He escapes just in time before being caught by ACP Malti who reaches his hotel suite in pursuit of Sarika. Karan who is bewildered at Sanjeev's death and his near shave with death wonders if Sanjeev was bumped off by a rival gang. 

Meanwhile, Sarika pretends to run into him. She pretends to have sympathy for him. Seeing that she still has not seen through his game, Karan decides to play with her for some time. Karan confronts a man whom he suspects to be a traitor, but he believes that somebody else could have sneaked in after Karan went out. Before the man can say anything, Karan kills him, too.

Sarika is amused as Karan gets entangled in a cat-and-mouse game. She steals money from Karan's boss, for which Karan is again made a patsy. However, Karan soon realises the plot. After he confronts and assaults her, she shocks him by telling him that she has burnt the money. Karan takes her to his boss and makes her confess at gunpoint. But she feigns ignorance and claims that Karan made her say so. As Karan is attacked by his boss's goons, he breaks into a fight. Just then, the ACP enters with the police.

In a shootout, the ACP succeeds in killing Karan's boss. The gang is either killed or apprehended. While the ACP herself gets shot, Karan succeeds in escaping. His success is short-lived: suddenly, Sarika emerges from his back and holds him at gunpoint and makes him drive to a secluded spot. After knocking him out, she chains him in a cavern infested with rats. As Karan regains consciousness, Sarika tells him how she used to be scared of rats and she chose this spot because she wanted him to go through the pain and suffering that she went through while she was in prison. Karan is baffled at her talk, but she leaves him in the cavern, with light from a flashlight pointing towards him.

Karan screams, but nobody hears as he is in a secluded place. Soon the flashlight goes out and Karan loses strength. A pack of rats attack and kill him brutally (shown by dimming of lights and screams). Karan dies a long and painful death. With her mission of exacting revenge from Karan accomplished, Sarika eventually surrenders to the police, turning in the bag of money that she stole from Karan's boss to the ACP. The film ends showing Sarika looking at inmates in a prison and leaves as if she finds her life's purpose.

Cast 

 Urmila Matondkar as Sarika Vartak
 Saif Ali Khan as Karan Singh Rathod
 Seema Biswas as ACP Malti Vaidya
 Aditya Srivastava as Advocate Kamlesh Mathur
 Pratima Kazmi as Prisoner Pramila
 Kavita Kaushik as Karan's Girlfriend in Delhi
 Zakir Hussain as Sanjiv Nanda
 Seema Adhikari as Dolly
 Rajendra Sethi as Sarika's Neighbour
 Gopal K Singh as Abhijeet
 Madan Joshi as Bilal
 Murali Sharma as Lawyer
 Ravi Kale as S.I.
 Abhay Bhargav as Nanda, Karan's boss
 Rasika Joshi as Prisoner Gomati
 Sheeba Chaddha as Anita

Production 
Saif Ali Khan was not sure about doing the project and especially portraying such a cunning and ruthless character. But the makers convinced him and he ultimately signed the film. For his first role as a villain, he received a lot of appreciation for his performance.

Soundtrack
The film's soundtrack and background score was composed by Amar Mohile. There are two songs that play mainly in the narrative. The first song 'Neend Na Aaye' that plays at the beginning of the film has been sung by Pandit Jasraj. The title song 'Ek Hasina Thi' plays in the second half of the movie.

Reception 
Taran Adarsh wrote that "On the whole, EK HASINA THI, in the spirit of RGV's other movies, has some fresh things to say about love, passion, deceit and destiny". A critic from Deccan Herald wrote that "His [Ram Gopal Varma's] ‘K Sera Sera Productions’ conjures up yet another superbly crafted movie; yet another promising director — Sriram Raghavan and yet another virtuoso performance by his muse, Urmila".

Impact 
The film was released without much of publicity and marketing but eventually went on to do good business at the box office. The film grossed 10 crores lifetime on the budget of 4 crores. Urmila Matondkar received high praise for her role of a merciless avenger and went on to win nominations at all major film award events. Ek Hasina Thi is considered one of the finest performances in her career.

References

External links 
 
 

2004 films
Indian avant-garde and experimental films
2000s Hindi-language films
Indian remakes of American films
2000s avant-garde and experimental films
Films directed by Sriram Raghavan
Fox Star Studios films
Sony Pictures films
Sony Pictures Networks India films
Columbia Pictures films
Films about mice and rats